Robert "Bobo" Sikorski (June 25, 1927 – August 23, 2014) was a Canadian football player who played for the BC Lions. He played junior football for the Vancouver Blue Bombers.

References

1927 births
BC Lions players
Canadian football people from Winnipeg
Players of Canadian football from Manitoba
2014 deaths